The Sparta Historic District in Sparta, Georgia, is a  historic district which was listed on the National Register of Historic Places in 1974.  It included 26 contributing buildings.  The Rossiter-Little House is a contributing property.

The district is roughly bounded by Hamilton, Elm, W, and Burwell Streets.

It includes the Hancock County Courthouse, a brick courthouse which was designed in 1881 by architects Parkins and Bruce of Atlanta.  The courthouse was completed by 1883. The morning of August 11, 2014, the courthouse was consumed in a fire, but was rebuilt and rededicated exactly 2-years after the fire.

Gallery

References

External links
 

Historic districts on the National Register of Historic Places in Georgia (U.S. state)
Greek Revival architecture in Georgia (U.S. state)
Victorian architecture in Georgia (U.S. state)
Buildings and structures completed in 1797
Hancock County, Georgia
William H. Parkins buildings